Sanctuary of Our Lady of Dzików, Monastery of Dominicans in Tarnobrzeg. In 1677 was founded church of Assumption of Mary by Tarnowski family and given to Dominican order. Destroyed in 1703. Rebuilt in 1706. In 1678 holy icon of Our Lady of Dzików was transferred from Dzików Castle to the monastery and since then the church became the Sanctuary of Our Lady of Dzików. Sometimes it is considered as the Our Lady of Tarnobrzeg or Queen of Sulfur Fields.

See also
 Dzików Castle – around 1 km from the monastery
 Church of Our Lady of Perpetual Help – other church in Tarnobrzeg

Roman Catholic churches in Tarnobrzeg
Baroque architecture in Poland
Tarnobrzeg
Tarnobrzeg
Tarnobrzeg
Religious buildings and structures completed in 1677
Roman Catholic churches completed in 1706
1706 establishments in the Polish–Lithuanian Commonwealth
18th-century Roman Catholic church buildings in Poland
17th-century Roman Catholic church buildings in Poland
The Most Holy Virgin Mary, Queen of Poland